Luis Alfonso Chiriboga Izquierdo is an Ecuadorian writer. He was born in Puerto Baquerizo on April 29, 1946.

He studied philosophy at the University of Zulia in Maracaibo, Venezuela. He went on to obtain a doctorate from the Sorbonne, and then taught philosophy at the Rafael María Baralt University in the city of Cabimas, Venezuela. He has also been a visiting professor at the Adam Mickiewicz University in Poznan. He has published among others: Los jardines del crepúsculo, Un sol de palabras, Poesía a la Intemperie, En busca de Octavio Paz, and La rosa de los vientos

Works
 1983 - Los jardines del crepúsculo (poetry)
 2001 - Un sol de palabras (poetry)
 2011 - Poesía a la intemperie (poetry)
 2012 - Oficina 29 (prose)
 2013 - En busca de Octavio Paz (essay)
 2018 - La Rosa de los vientos (novel)
 2019 - Grietas en la Sombra (poetry)
 2019 - El Gurú y Otras Narraciones Insólitas (prose)

References

Ecuadorian writers
1946 births
Living people